Josh Ryan Atencio (born January 31, 2002) is an American professional soccer player who plays as a midfielder for Major League Soccer club Seattle Sounders FC.

Career
Atencio joined the Seattle Sounders FC academy in 2016. He made his debut for USL club Seattle Sounders FC 2 in August 2018. Atencio signed a professional contract for the 2019 season. On June 15, 2020, Atencio signed a Homegrown Players contract with the Seattle Sounders.

Career statistics

Club

References

External links
 

2002 births
Living people
Sportspeople from Bellevue, Washington
Soccer players from Washington (state)
American soccer players
Association football midfielders
Major League Soccer players
USL Championship players
Tacoma Defiance players
Seattle Sounders FC players
Homegrown Players (MLS)
MLS Next Pro players